Ben Pirmann (born September 19, 1985) is an American soccer coach who is the head coach of USL Championship club Charleston Battery.

Playing career
Pirmann played four years of college soccer at Michigan State University between 2004 and 2008, including a redshirted year in 2007. Pirmann tallied 13 assists and scored one goal during his career, leading MSU in assists in 2006. He was a three-time Academic All-Big Ten selection and was the Spartans' recipient of the Big Ten Sportsmanship award in 2008.

Pirmann also played in the USL PDL with both West Michigan Edge and Indiana Invaders.

Management career
Pirmann began coaching at Western Michigan University in 2009. After three seasons, he moved to the same role with his alma mater Michigan State University. Whilst at MSU, Pirmann also coached NPSL side Detroit City FC since 2013, where he amassed a 49-17-17 regular-season record over the six seasons he was in charge.

On December 13, 2018, Pirmann joined USL Championship side Memphis 901 as their assistant coach. On September 15, 2020, following the dismissal of head coach Tim Mulqueen, Pirmann was named interim head coach for the remainder of the season. On April 8, 2021, he was named head coach on a permanent basis. On November 9, 2022, Pirmann was named 2022 USL Championship Coach of the Year.

On November 17, 2022, it was announced that Pirmann had left his head coaching position at Memphis 901 for the same role with the Charleston Battery.

Honors

Individual
USL Championship Coach of the Year: 2022

References

Living people
1985 births

Association football midfielders
American soccer players
American soccer coaches
Michigan State Spartans men's soccer players
Indiana Invaders players
West Michigan Edge players
USL League Two players
USL Championship coaches
People from Lake Orion, Michigan
Soccer players from Michigan
Sportspeople from Oakland County, Michigan
Western Michigan Broncos men's soccer coaches
Michigan State Spartans men's soccer coaches
National Premier Soccer League coaches
Charleston Battery coaches